is a Latin aphorism, usually translated "seize the day", taken from book 1 of the Roman poet Horace's work Odes (23 BC).

Translation
 is the second-person singular present active imperative of carpō "pick or pluck" used by Horace to mean "enjoy, seize, use, make use of". Diem is the accusative of dies "day". A more literal translation of  would thus be "pluck the day [as it is ripe]"—that is, enjoy the moment. It has been argued by various authors that this interpretation is closer to Horace's original meaning.

History

Sources
Text from Odes 1.11:

In ancient literature
Perhaps the first written expression of the concept is the advice given by Siduri to Gilgamesh, telling him to forgo his mourning and embrace life, although some scholars see it as simply urging Gilgamesh to abandon his mourning, "reversing the liminal rituals of mourning and returning to the normal and normative behaviors of Mesopotamian society."

Meaning
In Horace, the phrase is part of the longer , which is often translated as "Seize the day, put very little trust in tomorrow (the future)". The ode says that the future is unforeseen and that one should not leave to chance future happenings, but rather one should do all one can today to make one's own future better. This phrase is usually understood against Horace's Epicurean background.

Related expressions

Other Latin

 ("gather, girl, the roses") appears at the end of the poem "" ("Of growing roses", also called Idyllium de rosis) attributed to Ausonius or Virgil. It encourages youth to enjoy life before it is too late; compare "Gather ye rosebuds while ye may" from Robert Herrick's 1648 poem "To the Virgins, to Make Much of Time".

"" ("On the Shortness of Life"), often referred to as "Gaudeamus igitur", (Let us rejoice) is a popular academic commercium song, on taking joy in student life, with the knowledge that one will someday die. It is medieval Latin, dating to 1287.

For Horace, mindfulness of our own mortality is key in making us realize the importance of the moment. "Remember that you are mortal, so seize the day." Over time the phrase  also came to be associated with penitence, as suggested in many  paintings. Today many listeners will take the two phrases as representing almost opposite approaches, with  urging us to savour life and  urging us to resist its allure. This is not the original sense of the  phrase as used by Horace.

Contemporary mentions
In modern English, the expression "YOLO", meaning "you only live once", expresses a similar sentiment.

In the 1989 American film Dead Poets Society, the English teacher John Keating, played by Robin Williams, famously says: "Carpe diem. Seize the day, boys. Make your lives extraordinary." Later, this line was voted as the 95th greatest movie quote by the American Film Institute.

In the 2017 Korean drama series Chicago Typewriter, the club "Carpe Diem" is owned by Shin Yool and is the scene of revolutionary activities of the Joseon Youth Liberation Alliance spearheaded by Seo Hwi-young.

Social philosopher Roman Krznaric suggested in his book Carpe Diem Regained (2017) that carpe diem is the answer to consumer cultures schedules, timed work days, consumer culture and planning out our actions over the course of weeks and the weekends, instead of "just do it", with thought experiments for seizing the day rather than placing into calendars.

The song "Carpe Diem" by Joker Out is scheduled to represent Slovenia in the Eurovision Song Contest 2023.

References

External links

Literary interpretation of Horace, Odes 1.11 (Carpe diem) at YouTube 

Articles containing video clips
Horace
Latin mottos
Latin words and phrases
Time management